Aeroquetzal is a defunct airline formerly based at Guatemala La Aurora International Airport. Flying only regional routes first, Aeroquetzal later became the first Guatemalan airline besides Aviateca to operate a short lived scheduled passenger flight to Los Angeles International Airport in 1991. The flight existed for around one month only. However, like for all other airlines operating in Guatemala, the most important route was the one from Guatemala City to Flores Mundo Maya International Airport near Tikal. The airline ceased operations in 1992 due to financial problems.

Fleet 
The Aeroquetzal fleet included:
1 Convair 580 TG-MYM (now with Air Chathams)
1 McDonnell Douglas DC-9 N31UA (ex-KLM)
1 Airbus A-320 N482GX leased over three weeks from Lacsa

Destinations 
 Guatemala La Aurora International Airport
 Mundo Maya Int'l Airport
 Flores (Guatemala)
 Cancun International Airport
 Los Angeles International Airport

There were also flights existing between Flores and Cancun.

References

External links

Defunct airlines of Guatemala
Airlines established in 1987
Airlines disestablished in 1992
1992 disestablishments in Guatemala
Guatemalan companies established in 1987